Thomas D. Collins (August 14, 1847 - May 26, 1935) was an American soldier who fought in the American Civil War. Collins received the country's highest award for bravery during combat, the Medal of Honor, for his action during the Battle of Resaca in Georgia on 15 May 1864. He was honored with the award on 14 August 1896.

Biography
Collins was born in Neversink, New York on 14 August 1847. He enlisted in the 143rd New York Volunteer Infantry at Liberty, Sullivan County in New York. He died on 26 May 1935 and his remains are interred at Hillside Cemetery in Middletown, New York.

Medal of Honor citation

See also

List of American Civil War Medal of Honor recipients: A–F

References

1847 births
1935 deaths
People of New York (state) in the American Civil War
Union Army officers
United States Army Medal of Honor recipients
American Civil War recipients of the Medal of Honor